The 1960–61 St. Francis Terriers men's basketball team represented St. Francis College during the 1960–61 NCAA men's basketball season. The team was coached by Daniel Lynch, who was in his thirteenth year at the helm of the St. Francis Terriers. The team was a member of the Metropolitan New York Conference and played their home games at the 69th Regiment Armory in Manhattan. It was their first year hosting games at the 69th Regiment Armory, previously the Terriers played at the II Corps Artillery Armory in Park Slope, Brooklyn.

The Terriers finished the season at 10–10 overall and 2–1 in conference play. In December, the Terriers participated in the Middle Eastern College Athletic Association Tournament, they finished 6th out of eight teams.

Roster

Schedule and results

|-
!colspan=12 style="background:#0038A8; border: 2px solid #CE1126;;color:#FFFFFF;"| Regular Season

  

|-
!colspan=12 style="background:#0038A8; border: 2px solid #CE1126;;color:#FFFFFF;"| Middle Eastern College Athletic Association Tournament 

   
|-
!colspan=12 style="background:#0038A8; border: 2px solid #CE1126;;color:#FFFFFF;"| 

  

 

                 
|-

Middle Eastern College Athletic Association Tournament
The tournament took place at the Saint Peter's College gymnasium and the Jersey City Armory both located in Jersey City, NJ.

Awards

At the end of the season Richard Dreyer received an honorable-mention from the Metropolitan Basketball Writers Association.

References

St. Francis Brooklyn Terriers men's basketball seasons
St. Francis
Saint Francis
Saint Francis